Christopher Peter Caserne (born 22 February 1993) is a Mauritian international footballer who plays for Bolton City as a goalkeeper.

Career
Born in Port Louis, he has played club football for Cercle de Joachim and Bolton City.

He made his international debut for Mauritius in 2015.

References

1993 births
Living people
Mauritian footballers
Mauritius international footballers
Roche-Bois Bolton City YC players
Cercle de Joachim SC players
Association football goalkeepers